Lloa is a group of Austronesian indigenous Formosan people living in the southern plain of Taiwan. They have lived through the Dutch colonization of Taiwan, as well as the Manchurian occupation during the Qing dynasty.

Lloa are generally classified together with the Hoanya and Arikun as a single group, which idea has been rejected by some scholars and the indigenous people themselves.

See also 
 Hoanya people
 Arikun people
 Taiwanese indigenous peoples

Taiwanese indigenous peoples